Ekaterina Renzhina (born 18 October 1994) is a Russian sprinter. She competed in the 400 metres event at the 2015 World Championships in Athletics in Beijing, China.

References

External links

1994 births
Living people
Russian female sprinters
World Athletics Championships athletes for Russia
Place of birth missing (living people)
Athletes (track and field) at the 2010 Summer Youth Olympics
Universiade medalists in athletics (track and field)
Universiade gold medalists for Russia
Medalists at the 2013 Summer Universiade